The 130th Infantry Regiment is an infantry regiment in the Army National Guard. It is one of several Army National Guard units with campaign credit for the War of 1812.

History

Lineage
Constituted 1 March 1809 as the Volunteer Militia of Illinois Territory and organized thereafter as independent companies
 Mustered into federal service 18 February 1813 as the Regiment of Illinois Territory Militia; mustered out of federal service 16 June 1813 and elements reverted to independent status in the Illinois Territory Militia
(Illinois Territory Militia redesignated 26 August 1818 as the Illinois Militia)
 Reorganized and mustered into federal service 19 June 1831 as Duncan’s Brigade, to include the following units from central and southern Illinois:
 1st and 2d Regiments of Illinois Mounted Volunteers
 Major Bailey’s Odd Battalion
 Major Buckmaster’s Battalion of Spies.
Mustered out of federal service 2 July 1831 at Rock Island and elements reverted to independent status in the Illinois Militia
 Reorganized and mustered into federal service 30 April 1832 as Whiteside’s Brigade, to include five regiments of Illinois Mounted Volunteers.
Mustered out of federal service 28 May 1832 at the mouth of the Fox River; veterans concurrently reorganized and mustered into federal service as Colonel Jacob Fry’s Regiment of Illinois Volunteer Militia; mustered out of federal service 15 June 1832 at Ottawa.
 Major Bailey’s Odd Battalion and Major Buckmaster’s Battalion of Spies mustered into federal service 20 June 1832; mustered out of federal service 13 August 1832 at Fort Walker, Illinois
 Reorganized as the 1st, 2d, 3d, and 4th Regiments, Illinois Volunteer Militia, and mustered into federal service 30 June – 4 July 1846 at Alton, Illinois, and Jefferson Barracks, Missouri
 1st and 2d Regiments mustered out of federal service 17–18 June 1847 at Camargo, Mexico; 3d and 4th Regiments mustered out of federal service 25–29 May 1847 at New Orleans, Louisiana
 Reorganized as the 7th, 8th, 9th, and 10th Regiments, Illinois Volunteer Infantry, and mustered into federal service 25–29 April 1861 at Springfield and Cairo
 Mustered out of federal service 25–26 July 1861 at Cairo; concurrently reorganized and mustered into federal service at Cairo
 10th Regiment mustered out of federal service 4 July 1865 at Louisville, Kentucky; 7th and 9th Regiments mustered out of federal service 9 July 1865 at Louisville, Kentucky; 8th Regiment mustered out of federal service 4 May 1866 at Baton Rouge, Louisiana
 Reorganized 1874-1875 in the Illinois Militia as independent companies
 Companies in central and southern Illinois consolidated 21 December 1875 to form the 5th Infantry Regiment
 (Illinois Militia redesignated 21 December 1875 as the Illinois State Guard; Illinois State Guard redesignated 1 July 1877 as the Illinois National Guard)
 Reorganized 1881-1882 as the 5th and 8th Infantry Regiments
 8th Infantry Regiment redesignated 31 December 1890 as the 4th Infantry Regiment
 5th Infantry Regiment mustered into federal service 4–9 May 1898 at Springfield as the 5th Illinois Volunteer Infantry; mustered out of federal service 16 October 1898 at Atlanta, Georgia, and reverted to state status as the 5th Infantry
 4th Infantry Regiment mustered into federal service 19–20 May 1898 at Springfield as the 4th Illinois Volunteer Infantry; mustered out of federal service 2 May 1899 at Atlanta, Georgia, and reverted to state status as the 4th Infantry
 4th Infantry mustered into federal service 27 June 1916; mustered out of federal service 15 March 1917 at Fort Sheridan, Illinois
 4th and 5th Infantry drafted into federal service 5 August 1917. Former 4th and 5th Infantry reorganized as federal and redesignated 12 October 1917 as the 130th Infantry and the 123d Machine Gun Battalion, respectively, elements of the 33rd Infantry
 Demobilized 31 May 1919 at Camp Grant (Illinois)
 Reorganized in 1921 in the Illinois National Guard as the 4th and 5th Infantry
 Consolidated 22 June 1921 and consolidated unit designated as the 4th Infantry
 Redesignated 13 December 1921 as the 130th Infantry and assigned to the 33d Division (later redesignated as the 33d Infantry Division); Headquarters federally recognized 24 May 1922 at Delavan
 (Location of headquarters changed 14 May 1940 to Carbondale)
 Inducted into federal service 5 March 1941 at home stations
 Inactivated 5 February 1946 in Japan
Relieved 5 July 1946 from assignment to the 33d Infantry Division and assigned to the 44th Infantry Division (United States)
 Reorganized and federally recognized 27 March 1947 in the Illinois National Guard with headquarters at Danville.
Ordered into active federal service 15 February 1952 at home stations; released 10 October 1954 from active federal service and reverted to state control; concurrently relieved from assignment to the 44th Infantry Division
 Consolidated 1 December 1954 with the 132d Infantry (organized and federally recognized 16 March 1954 in the Illinois Army National Guard with headquarters at Carbondale), and consolidated unit designated as the 130th Infantry, with headquarters at Carbondale, and assigned to the 33d Infantry Division
 Reorganized 1 March 1959 as a parent regiment under the Combat Arms Regimental System to consist of the 1st and 2d Battle Groups, elements of the 33d Infantry Division
 Reorganized 1 April 1963 to consist of the 1st, 2d, and 3d Battalions, elements of the 33d Infantry Division
 Reorganized 1 February 1968 to consist of the 2d and 3d Battalions, elements of the 47th Infantry Division
Withdrawn 5 February 1987 from the Combat Arms Regimental System and reorganized under the United States Army Regimental System with headquarters at Urbana
 Reorganized 10 February 1991 to consist of the 2d and 3d Battalions, elements of the 34th Infantry Division
 Reorganized 1 October 1996 to consist of the 2d Battalion, an element of the 35th Infantry Division.
Ordered into active federal service 5 January 2005 at home stations; released from active federal service 1 September 2006 and reverted to state control; concurrently, relieved from assignment to the 35th Infantry Division and assigned to the 33d Infantry Brigade Combat Team
 Redesignated 1 October 2005 as the 130th Infantry Regiment
 (Location of headquarters changed 1 September 2006 to Marion)

Distinctive Unit Insignia
 Description
A Gold color metal and enamel device 1 1/8 inches (2.86 cm) in height overall consisting of a shield blazoned:  Argent, a fess Gules of the first and Vert fesswise between, in chief two arrows Or saltirewise behind a Black hawk and in base a fleur-de-lis of the second, overall a saltire Azure.  Attached below the shield a Gold scroll inscribed "ALWAYS READY" in Black letters.
 Symbolism
The shield is white, the old Infantry color.  Service in the Black Hawk War is symbolized by the Black Hawk and the two red arrows, service in the Mexican War by the horizontal belt across the shield of red, white and green, the colors of the Mexican flag.  The Civil War service is indicated by the blue saltire cross from the Confederate flag.  The service in France during World War I is indicated by the fleur-de-lis.
 Background
The distinctive unit insignia was approved on 3 February 1925.

Coat of arms
Blazon
Shield
Argent, a fess Gules of the first and Vert fesswise between, in chief two arrows of the second saltirewise behind a Black hawk Proper and in base a fleur-de-lis of the second, overall a saltire Azure.
 Crest
That for the regiments and separate battalions of the Illinois Army National Guard:  On a wreath Argent and Azure, upon a grassy field the blockhouse of old Fort Dearborn Proper. Motto:  ALWAYS READY.
 Symbolism
 Shield
The shield is white, the old Infantry color.  Service in the Black Hawk War is symbolized by the Black Hawk and the two red arrows, service in the Mexican War by the horizontal belt across the shield of red, white and green, the colors of the Mexican flag.  The Civil War service is indicated by the blue saltire cross from the Confederate flag.  The service in France during World War I is indicated by the fleur-de-lis.
 Crest
The crest is that of the Illinois Army National Guard.
 Background
The coat of arms was approved on 17 June 1924.

Campaign streamers
War of 1812
 Streamer without inscription
Indian Wars
 Black Hawk
Mexican War
 Buena Vista
 Vera Cruz
 Cerro Gordo
Civil War
 Henry and Donelson
 Shiloh
 Vicksburg
 Chattanooga
 Atlanta
 Missouri 1861
 Kentucky 1861
 Kentucky 1862
 Mississippi 1862
 Mississippi 1863
 Alabama 1862
 Alabama 1863
 Alabama 1864
 Tennessee 1862
 Tennessee 1863
 Tennessee 1864
 Georgia 1864
 North Carolina 1865
 South Carolina 1865
World War I
 Somme Offensive
 Meuse-Argonne
 Lorraine 1918
 Picardy 1918
World War II
 New Guinea
 Luzon
War on Terrorism
 Iraq:
 Iraqi Governance
 National Resolution
Headquarters Company, 2d Battalion (Marion), additionally entitled to:
 World War II
 Asiatic-Pacific Theater, Streamer without inscription

Decorations
 Philippine Presidential Unit Citation, Streamer embroidered 17 OCTOBER 1944 TO 4 JULY 1945

See also
 Distinctive unit insignia (U.S. Army)

References
 
 

 Encyclopedia of United States Army insignia and uniforms By William K. Emerson (page 51).

External links
 http://www.history.army.mil/html/forcestruc/lineages/branches/inf/0130in.htm

Illinois National Guard units
130
Military units and formations in Illinois
130
Military units and formations established in 1809